Rātana Pā, or Ratana Community, is a town in the North Island of New Zealand, near Whanganui and Marton in the Manawatū-Whanganui region. The locality was the farm of Tahupōtiki Wiremu Rātana, the founder of a Maori religious and political movement, and the settlement developed in the 1920s as followers came to see Rātana. It continues as the centre of the Rātana Church.  Due to the importance of the Rātana movement in New Zealand politics, leading New Zealand politicians often attend annual gatherings at Rātana Pā.

Location
Rātana Pā is 20 km south-east of Whanganui, 5 km west of Turakina and 19 km west of Marton. It lies between State Highway 3 and the coast.

History 

Rātana Pā is on what was the farm of Tahupōtiki Wiremu Rātana, the founder of the Rātana religious and political movement and the Rātana Church. The locality became a settlement of Rātana followers in the 1920s.

Facilities at Rātana Pā include the 1,000-seat Temepara Tapu o Ihoa (Holy Temple of Jehovah), the Manuao (an accommodation facility and head office of the church), the Whare Māori (which contains crutches and wheelchairs from followers who were healed by Rātana in the 1920s and 1930s) and the Ratana Archives Center, which contains artifacts and stories from the history of the Rātana Church.

25 January and 8 November are anniversary days of the Rātana Church. On these days thousands of members of the church converge on Rātana Pā for the special anniversary services commemorating the birth of Rātana (25 January 1873) and his first spiritual vision (8 November 1918). The gathering for the birth anniversary lasts for a week, with the highlight being the Temple Service on 25 January. Usually, Members of Parliament (MPs) visit on 24 January to talk and seek the votes of Māori.

Government and politics

Local government
Rātana Pā is in the Southern ward of Rangitikei District, which elects three of the eleven members of the Rangitikei District Council. There is also a Rātana Community Board, one of two community boards in the District (the other being for Taihape). The Board has four elected members and one appointed councillor from the Southern ward.

National government
Rātana Pā, like the rest of the Rangitikei District, is located in the general electorate of Rangitīkei and in the Māori electorate of Te Tai Hauāuru. Rangitīkei is a safe National Party seat since the 1938 election with the exception of 1978–1984 when it was held by Bruce Beetham of the Social Credit Party. Since 2011 it is held by Ian McKelvie.

Te Tai Hauāuru is a more volatile seat, having been held by three different parties since 1996, i.e. New Zealand First, the Māori Party and the Labour Party. Since 2014 it is held by Adrian Rurawhe of the Labour Party.

Demographics

The population of Rātana was 345 in the 2018 New Zealand census, an increase of 18 (5.5%) since the 2013 census, and a decrease of 21 (-5.7%) since the 2006 census. There were 153 males and 192 females, giving a sex ratio of 0.8 males per female. Ethnicities were 42 people  (12.2%) European/Pākehā, 330 (95.7%) Māori, 15 (4.3%) Pacific peoples, and 3 (0.9%) Asian (totals add to more than 100% since people could identify with multiple ethnicities). Of the total population, 66 people  (19.1%) were under 15 years old, 84 (24.3%) were 15–29, 159 (46.1%) were 30–64, and 39 (11.3%) were over 65.

Transport
State Highway 3  is located 2 km to the northeast of Rātana Pā. This national state highway connects Woodville (25 km east of Palmerston North) and Hamilton via New Plymouth.

InterCity runs three daily and six non-daily services at the Ratana Turn Off stop. These include Palmerston North–Auckland, Wellington–New Plymouth and Auckland–Palmerston North.

The nearest airport is Whanganui Airport, located 22 km to the northwest of the town.

Education

The nearest secondary schools are in Whanganui and Marton.

Table footnotes

References

External links 
 Ratana church history

Populated places in Manawatū-Whanganui
Rangitikei District